Tichý Potok ( until 1948; ;) is a village and municipality in Sabinov District in the Prešov Region of north-eastern Slovakia.

History
In historical records the village was first mentioned in 1427.

Geography
The municipality lies at an altitude of 527 metres and covers an area of 8,441 km². It has a population of about 397 people.

External links
The official village website is http://www.tichypotok.sk
Tichý Potok - The Carpathian Connection
http://www.statistics.sk/mosmis/eng/run.html

Villages and municipalities in Sabinov District
Šariš